Corvinus or Corvin may refer to:

Surname
 John Hunyadi (Latin: Ioannes Corvinus), regent (1446–1453) of the Kingdom of Hungary
 King Matthias Corvinus of Hungary (1443–1490)
 The Hunyadi family
 János Corvinus, son of King Matthias Corvinus of Hungary
 László Hunyadi, elder son of John Hunyadi
 Marcus Valerius Messalla Corvinus, considered by legend to be the ancestor of the above
 Peter the Lame's epitaph identifies his ancestral origin in the Royal house of Corvinus.
 Johannes Arnoldi Corvinus (Dutch: Joannes Arnoldsz Ravens), cleric and writer (c.1582–1650)

Fictional characters 
 Characters in the Underworld series of films, including
 Markus Corvinus
 William Corvinus
 Alexander Corvinus Known as The Father of All. He was the Immortal father of William and Markus Corvinus.

Other 
 Corvinus University of Budapest (former BUESPA)
 Corvinus, a typeface designed by Imre Reiner.
 Corvinus International Investment Ltd., an investment company owned by Hungarian state, acting as a sovereign fund

Latin-language surnames
Surnames of Hungarian origin